Arumah a biblical toponym mentioned in the Book of Judges (9:41): "Then Abimelek stayed in Arumah, and Zebul drove Gaal and his clan out of Shechem." The reference is in the context of story describing a local revolt against Abimelech, the king of Shechem and the son of judge Gideon.

Possible locations

Duma

It has been suggested that Arumah was located at Duma, Nablus.

Khirbet el-'Ormeh

Charles William Meredith van de Velde passed by Khirbet el-'Ormeh in 1851/2,  and noted "I believe I may recognise the Arumah of Judges ix 41".

References

Bibliography

Place names
Biblical places